The Association for Library Service to Children (ALSC) is a division of the American Library Association, and it is the world's largest organization dedicated to library service to children. Its members are dedicated to creating a better future for children through libraries.

ALSC has over 4,000 members, including children's and youth librarians, experts in children's literature, publishers, education and library school faculty members, and other adults committed to library services for young people. The Association has nearly 60 active committees and task forces that carry out its work, including developing programs for youth, publishing resources and journals for youth librarians, and evaluating and awarding media for children.

ALSC sets standards for library services to children through regular updates to its "Competencies for Librarians Serving Children in Public Libraries." The most recent competencies, adopted in 2015, emphasize seven core areas of competence, including services, programs, outreach, collection development, and administrative practices that contribute to high-quality library services for youth.

Major initiatives
The Association of Library Service to Children supports five major initiatives focused on continuing education for children's librarians; enhanced library services and programming for children aged 0–14 years; and collaboration with other agencies serving youth.

El Día de los Niños/El Día de los Libros (Children's Day/Book Day) 
El día de los niños/El día de los libros (Children's Day/Book Day), commonly known as Día or Diversity in Action, is an ongoing celebration of children, families, and reading that culminates yearly on April 30. Día was created by author/illustrator Pat Mora in collaboration with REFORMA.

Babies Need Words Every Day
As part of their commitment to bridging the 30 million word gap, ALSC created colorful posters and booklists designed to be hung in accessible public spaces, such as bathroom changing tables and on buses, to inform parents of ways to read, talk, sing, and play with their babies. Posters are available to print for free in both English and Spanish.

Every Child Ready to Read @ your library
Every Child Ready to Read @ your library, commonly abbreviated as ECRR, is a parent education program designed by ALSC and the Public Library Association. The initiative focuses on the development of early literacy skills in children ages 0–5. Many storytimes and other early childhood programs in libraries across the world incorporate research and practices from ECRR. The ECRR toolkit is designed to help librarians teach parents that early literacy begins at home and is taught by parents. The toolkit was revised in 2011.

Media mentorship
In 2015, the ALSC Board accepted a white paper titled "Media Mentorship in Libraries Serving Youth". This paper outlines the role of librarians and other library staff who serve youth and families with particular regard to materials and practices surrounding digital media.

Everyday Advocacy
In recognition that libraries must advocate for their patrons and themselves within their communities, Everyday Advocacy provides resources and training materials to empower library workers to take action in a grassroots effort to build awareness of and support for the library. ALSC continually advocates for the support and enhancement of library services to children and those who provide it by encouraging practitioners to speak out within their communities to promote the value of those services. The division also partners with other agencies that serve children to spread the word about the power of reading, early literacy, and youth services.

Awards, grants, and scholarships

Book and media awards
ALSC announces the awards listed below every January at a Monday morning press conference that takes place during the American Library Association Midwinter Meeting.
 The Newbery Medal was named for eighteenth-century British bookseller John Newbery. It is awarded annually to the author of the most distinguished contribution to American literature for children.
 The Caldecott Medal was named in honor of nineteenth-century English illustrator Randolph Caldecott. It is awarded annually to the artist of the most distinguished American picture book for children.
 The Batchelder Award was named in honor of twetieth-century American librarian Mildred L. Batchelder.  The Batchelder Award is unusual in that it is given to a publisher, yet explicitly references a given work, its translator and author. It seeks to recognize translations of children's books into the English language, with the intention of encouraging American publishers to translate high quality foreign language children's books and "promote communication between the people of the world".
 The Belpré Medal was named in honor of twentieth-century Puerto Rican librarian Pura Belpré.  It is given in honor to a Latino or Latina writer and illustrator whose works best portray, affirm, and celebrate the Latino cultural experience in an outstanding work of literature for children and youth. It has been given every other year since 1996. Beginning with the 2009 award, it will be given annually.
 The Carnegie Medal was named in honor of nineteenth-century American philanthropist Andrew Carnegie.  It honors the producer of the most outstanding video production for children.
 The Children's Literature Lecture Award (formerly called the "May Hill Arbuthnot Lecture Award from 1970-2020), was originally named in honor of twentieth-century American educator May Hill Arbuthnot. It is awarded annually to honor an author, critic, librarian, historian, or teacher of children's literature, of any country, who shall prepare a paper considered to be a significant contribution to the field of children's literature.  This paper is delivered as a lecture each year, and is subsequently published in Children and Libraries, the journal of ALSC. 
 The Geisel Award was named in honor of twentieth-century American author Theodor Seuss Geisel. It is given annually to the author(s) and illustrator(s) of the most distinguished American book for beginning readers published in English in the United States during the preceding year.
 The Odyssey Award was named in honor of the Homer's eighth century BC epic poem to remind us of the ancient roots of storytelling, while living in our modern world.  The Odyssey Award is jointly given and administered by the ALSC and the Young Adult Library Services Association (YALSA), another division of the ALA. It is sponsored by Booklist magazine, a publication of the ALA.
 The Sibert Medal was named in honor of twentieth-century American publisher Robert F. Sibert. It honors the author(s) and illustrator(s) of the most distinguished informational book.
 The Children's Literature Legacy Award (previously named the Wilder Medal) was originally named in honor of twentieth-century American author Laura Ingalls Wilder but the name was changed in 2018.  It honors an author or illustrator whose books, published in the United States, have made, over a period of years, a substantial and lasting contribution to literature for children.

Children's notable lists
In addition to the above listed awards, ALSC produces three lists of notable media titles:
 Notable Children's Books (annual)
Notable Children's Recordings (annual)
Notable Children's Videos (annual)

Partnership grants
 Dollar General Literacy Foundation 
 Disney

ALSC also ran Great Websites for Kids, a compilation of exemplary websites geared to children from birth to age 14. Suggested sites were evaluated by the Great Websites for Kids Committee using established selection criteria. The Great Websites for Kids program ended in 2016.

See also

Young Adult Library Services Association (YALSA)

References

External links
ALSC home page
ALSC Blog
ALSC Book and Media Awards
El día de los niños/El día de los libros (Children's Day/Book Day)

Library associations in the United States
Children's literature organizations
American Library Association